This is a complete list of members of the United States House of Representatives during the 1st United States Congress listed by seniority. As a historical article, the districts and party affiliations listed reflect those during the 1st Congress (March 4, 1789 – March 3, 1791). Current seats and party affiliations on the List of current members of the United States House of Representatives by seniority will be different for certain members.

Seniority depends on the date on which members were sworn into office. Congressmen, in early Congresses, were often elected after the legal start of the Congress. Such representatives are attributed with unbroken seniority, from the legal start of the congressional term, if they were the first person elected to a seat in a Congress. The date of the election is indicated in a note.

The seniority date is normally taken from the members entry in the Biographical Directory of the United States Congress, except where the date given is the legal start of the Congress and the actual election (for someone who was not the first person elected to the seat in that Congress) was later. The date of election is taken from United States Congressional Elections 1788-1997. In a few instances the latter work provides dates, for the start and end of terms, which correct those in the Biographical Directory.

The Biographical Directory normally uses the date of a special election, as the seniority date.  However, mostly in early Congresses, the date of the member taking his seat can be the one given. The date of the special election is mentioned in a note to the list below, when that date is not used as the seniority date by the Biographical Directory.

In the 1st Congress the only formal leader was the Speaker of the House. This congress had only one standing committee, the Committee on Elections, created on April 13, 1789. There was also a Ways and Means Committee for part of the 1st session. Although the Ways and Means Committee was not formally added to the list of standing committees until 1802, the present-day committee considers the one established in 1789 to be its forerunner. Committees, in this period, were appointed for a session at a time and not necessarily for every one in a Congress. Apart from the members of the Elections Committee in the 1st session (who were selected by balloting the House), the Speaker appointed the members. The office of speaker and other party or committee leadership positions in the House are often associated with seniority. However, leadership is typically not associated with seniority.

U.S. House seniority list
A numerical rank is assigned to each of the 65 members initially elected to the 1st Congress. Other members, who were not the first person elected to a seat but who joined the House during the Congress, are not assigned a number (apart from the Representatives from the two states, admitted after ratifying the constitution during the Congress, who are numbered 60-65). One Representative-elect was not sworn in, as he declined to serve. The list below includes that Representative-elect (with name in italics), with the seniority he would have held if he had been sworn in.

Notes

References

 United States Congressional Elections 1788-1997, by Michael J. Dubin (McFarland and Company 1998)

See also
1st United States Congress
List of United States congressional districts
List of United States senators in the 1st Congress by seniority

External links
House Journal, First Forty-three Sessions of Congress
House of Representatives list of members of the 1st Congress

1
1st United States Congress